Bolshaya Nazarovskaya is a rural locality (a village) in Yavengskoye Rural Settlement, Vozhegodsky District, Vologda Oblast, Russia. The population was 6 in 2002.

Geography 
Bolshaya Nazarovskaya is located 17 km northwest of Vozhega (the district's administrative centre) by road. Okulovskaya is the nearest rural locality.

References 

Rural localities in Vozhegodsky District